The Harding Street Station (formerly Elmer W. Stout Generating Station) was a 12-unit, 1,196 MW nameplate capacity, gas-, coal, and oil-fired generating station located at 3700 South Harding Street, Indianapolis. It is owned by AES Indiana, a subsidiary of AES (formerly known as Indianapolis Power & Light).

Environmental impact

Sulphur dioxide
With its oldest coal-fired unit dating back to 1958, the plant was ranked 12th on the United States list of dirtiest power plants in terms of sulphur dioxide emissions per megawatt-hour of electrical energy produced from coal in 2005. 

The new flue gas desulphurization system (FGS), also known as a scrubber, and the new stack are expected to reduce sulfur dioxide (SO2) emissions by 97 percent, and NOxemissions, as well as other pollutants, by some 87 percent.

IPL stopped burning coal at the Harding Street facility in 2016 and retrofitted the units to natural gas.

Coal ash ponds 
On the south side of the former plant are a sequence of unlined coal ash ponds. As of 2019, there were 27 groundwater monitoring wells. Between 2016 and 2019, 24 of these were polluted above federal advisory levels of molybdenum, boron, lithium, sulfate, arsenic, antimony, selenium, and cobalt.

See also

 List of power stations in Indiana
 Global warming

References

External links 
  at SourceWatch

Energy infrastructure completed in 1941
Energy infrastructure completed in 1947
Energy infrastructure completed in 1958
Energy infrastructure completed in 1961
Energy infrastructure completed in 1967
Energy infrastructure completed in 1973
Energy infrastructure completed in 1994
Energy infrastructure completed in 1995
Energy infrastructure completed in 2002
Coal-fired power stations in Indiana
Natural gas-fired power stations in Indiana
Oil-fired power stations in Indiana
Buildings and structures in Indianapolis
1941 establishments in Indiana